United Nations Security Council Resolution 277, adopted on March 18, 1970, concerned the state of Southern Rhodesia, now known as Zimbabwe. The Council reaffirmed its previous resolutions and noted with grave concern that efforts thus far to bring the rebellion to the end had failed, some countries (Portugal and South Africa mentioned specifically) had not been obeying the Council's resolutions and that the situation in Southern Rhodesia continued to deteriorate as a result of the regime's new measures.

The Council also reaffirmed the United Kingdom's responsibility over the territory and demanded the immediate withdrawal of South African armed personnel from Southern Rhodesia. The Council finished by deciding that all member states shall immediately sever all diplomatic, consular, trade, military and other relations and terminate any representation that they maintained in the territory, immediately interrupt any existing means of transportation to and from Southern Rhodesia and that international and regional organizations suspend the illegal regime's membership.

The resolution was adopted near unanimously, while Spain abstained.

See also
 List of United Nations Security Council Resolutions 201 to 300 (1965–1971)
 Unilateral Declaration of Independence (Rhodesia)

References 
Text of the Resolution at undocs.org

External links
 

 0277
 0277
 0277
 0277
United Nations Security Council sanctions regimes
March 1970 events